Scott is the debut solo album by Scott Walker, originally released in the United Kingdom on Philips Records in 1967. The album received both strong commercial success as well as critical praise, hitting No. 3 on the UK Albums Chart. The album was produced by John Franz, who had previously worked with Walker's group the Walker Brothers, while its instrumental accompaniments were arranged and conducted by Angela Morley, Reg Guest and Peter Knight.

Overview
Scott was released only six months after Walker's third album with The Walker Brothers, Images. Its mixture of Walker's original compositions and selection of cover versions established Walker as a more serious and sombre artist; gone were the Beat group and Blue-eyed soul material of his former group. The choice of material generally fell into four main categories: his own work ("Montague Terrace (In Blue)", "Such a Small Love", "Always Coming Back to You"), contemporary covers ("The Lady Came from Baltimore", "Angelica"), movie songs ("You're Gonna Hear From Me", "Through a Long and Sleepless Night") and significantly, English-translated versions of the songs of the Belgian singer and songwriter Jacques Brel ("Mathilde", "My Death", "Amsterdam"). Brel was a major influence on Walker's own compositions, and Walker included three of his songs on each of his next two solo albums, Scott 2 and Scott 3. Walker described Brel without qualification as 'the most significant singer-songwriter in the world'. The real coup for Walker was his luck in acquiring and recording the new Mort Shuman-translated versions of Brel's material before anyone else.

Since the album's release, three complete outtakes, likely recorded during the Scott album sessions, have circulated in bootlegged form. These are "Free Again" (Basile/Canfora/Colby/Jourdan), "I Get Along Without You Very Well" (Hoagy Carmichael) and "I Think I'm Getting Over You" (Roger Cook/Roger Greenaway), the latter of which was recorded for potential single release.

Release and reception
The album was released by Philips Records in September 1967 in the UK. It reached No. 3 on the UK Albums Chart, and stayed on the chart for seventeen weeks. It was released the following year in the US on Smash Records under the title Aloner.

Track listing

Personnel
 Scott Walker – vocals
 Angela Morley – arrangements, conductor (Tracks 1,2,5,7 & 8)
 Reg Guest – arrangements, conductor (Tracks 3,4,6 & 11)
 Peter Knight – arrangements, conductor (Tracks 9 & 10)
 Peter Olliff – engineer

Release history

Charts

References

Scott Walker (singer) albums
Song recordings with Wall of Sound arrangements
1967 debut albums
Albums conducted by Wally Stott
Albums conducted by Peter Knight (composer)
Albums arranged by Peter Knight (composer)
Albums produced by Johnny Franz
Philips Records albums
Smash Records albums
Fontana Records albums